Adrian Mannarino was the defending champion.
Daniel Evans defeated Jan Minář in the final (6–3, 6–2).

Seeds

Draw

Final four

Top half

Bottom half

External links
 Main Draw
 Qualifying Draw

The Caversham International - Singles
The Jersey International